The Wenxian knobby newt or Wenxian knobby salamander (Tylototriton wenxianensis) is a species of salamander in the family Salamandridae. It is endemic to central China (southern Gansu and adjacent northern Sichuan, isolated records from Guizhou, Hunan, Jiangxi, and Anhui provinces).

Description
Tylototriton wenxianensis is a medium-sized representative of Tylototriton. It is dorsally entirely black, and ventrally brownish black. Tips of digits and lower tail margin are orange Skin is rough. Head is flat and oval. Tail is laterally compressed and shorter than snout–vent length.

Habitat and conservation
Tylototriton wenxianensis inhabits forests near streams and pools in hilly areas, hiding under rocks. Eggs are laid on land or between water and land; the larvae develop in water.

It is threatened by habitat loss and degradation due to farming and subsistence wood collection.

References

Tylototriton
Amphibians of China
Endemic fauna of China
Taxonomy articles created by Polbot
Amphibians described in 1984